Joseph Fry(e) may refer to:

Joseph Storrs Fry (1769–1835), owner of a chocolate factory
Joseph Storrs Fry II (1826–1913), grandson of the first Joseph Storrs Fry
Joseph Fry (tea merchant) (1777–1861), tea dealer and banker, husband of Elizabeth Fry, the prison reformer, cousin of Joseph Storrs Fry
Joseph Fry (type-founder) (1728–1787), Bristol businessman, father of Joseph Storrs Fry
Joseph Fry Jr. (1781–1860), US Representative from Pennsylvania
Joe Fry (1915–1950), racing driver
Joseph Frye (1712–1794), American military leader during the Revolutionary War
 Joseph Frye, designer and proponent of Fort Frye in the Ohio Country during the Northwest Indian War